Paragoniaeola tanycephala is a species of ulidiid or picture-winged fly in the genus Paragoniaeola of the family Ulidiidae.

References

Ulidiidae